Pterodecta felderi is a moth of the  family Callidulidae. It is found in the Russian Far East, India, Japan, China and Taiwan.

The larvae feed on Matteuccia and Osmundastrum species.

Callidulidae
Moths of Japan
Moths described in 1864